Weverton Almeida Santos (born 28 March 1988 in São Mateus, Espírito Santo), commonly known as Ferrugem, is a Brazilian footballer who plays as right back and a midfielder for Cuiabá.

Career
Ferrugem began his career with Criciúma youth, before moves to São Mateus, Gama and then Ceilandense. After a short stay with Ceilandense, Ferrugem returned to Gama in 2010. His second spell with Gama lasted just a matter of months as he joined Brasiliense in June, he appeared in 22 matches of Brasiliense's relegation campaign from Série B. 30 appearances followed in 2011 and 2012 before completing a transfer to current club Ponte Preta. After 24 appearances in all competitions over two seasons for Ponte Preta, Ferrugem agreed to join Corinthians on loan. He made his Corinthians debut in an away win against rivals Santos, he participated in five more games for the club before returning to Ponte Preta.

2015 saw Ferrugem move out of Brazil for the first time in his career as he joined J1 League side Vissel Kobe on loan. He played in 8 league matches and 4 cup games before departing in July. Upon arriving back in his homeland, Ferrugem spent the rest of 2015 with Sport. He returned to Ponte Preta in 2016 and played six times for the club in the 2016 Campeonato Paulista before again leaving the club on loan, this time he completed a move to Figueirense.

Honours
Brasiliense
Campeonato Brasiliense (1): 2011

Ponte Preta
Campeonato Paulista do Interior (1): 2013

References

External links

Living people
1988 births
Sportspeople from Espírito Santo
Brazilian footballers
Association football defenders
Campeonato Brasileiro Série A players
Campeonato Brasileiro Série B players
Campeonato Brasileiro Série C players
Sociedade Esportiva do Gama players
Brasiliense Futebol Clube players
Associação Atlética Ponte Preta players
Sport Club Corinthians Paulista players
Figueirense FC players
J1 League players
J2 League players
Vissel Kobe players
Ventforet Kofu players
Sport Club do Recife players
Brazilian expatriate footballers
Brazilian expatriate sportspeople in Japan
Expatriate footballers in Japan
Association football midfielders